Turkmenistan competed at the 2018 Asian Games in Jakarta and Palembang, Indonesia, from 18 August to 2 September 2018. Turkmenistan first participated at the Asian Games in 1994 Hiroshima, and at the last edition in Incheon, the country won a silver and a bronze medals.

Medalists

The following Turkmenistan competitors won medals at the Games.

|  style="text-align:left; width:78%; vertical-align:top;"|

|  style="text-align:left; width:22%; vertical-align:top;"|

Competitors 
The following is a list of the number of competitors representing Turkmenistan that participated at the Games:

Athletics 

Turkmenistan entered one male athlete to participate in the athletics competition at the Games.

Basketball 

Summary

3x3 basketball
Turkmenistan national 3x3 team participated in the Games, the men's team placed in the pool D based on the FIBA 3x3 federation ranking.

Men's tournament

Roster
The following is the Turkmenistan roster in the men's 3x3 basketball tournament of the 2018 Asian Games.
Kerim Mammetmyradov (4)
Ahmet Kiyathanov (9)
Alihan Bekchanov (12)
Merdan Hojamedov (14)

Pool D

Boxing 

Turkmen Boxing Federation sent their athletes to compete at the Games. After won 11 medals at the 2017 Asian Indoor and Martial Arts Games, the men's and women's boxers has attended international training camps in Ashgabat.

Men

Ju-jitsu 

Men

Women

Judo 

Turkmenistan participated in judo at the Games with 4 judokas (3 men's and 1 women's).

Men

Women

Kurash 

Men

Women

Sambo

Swimming 

Men

Weightlifting

Men

Women

Wrestling 

Turkmenistan set-up ten men's wrestler to compete at the Games. Şyhazberdi Öwelekow won a bronze medal in the Greco-Roman 87 kg, became the only medal for the contingent in the wrestling competition. Rüstem Nazarow who competed in freestyle 57 kg originally got the 11th place, but was disqualified after he tested positive for Furosemide in a pre-tournament urine test.

Men's freestyle

Men's Greco-Roman

References 

Nations at the 2018 Asian Games
2018
Asian Games